Charles A. Beggs (November 1, 1860 – November 2, 1939) was an American politician and businessman.

Born in Plainfield, Wisconsin, Beggs went to public school. Beggs owned potato warehouses in Waushara and Portage Counties, Wisconsin. He was involved with the retail mercantile business in Rice Lake, Barron County, Wisconsin. Beggs served as president of the village of Cameron, Wisconsin. He also served on the Barron County Board of Supervisors. Beggs served in the Wisconsin State Assembly from 1921 to 1923, from 1927 to 1933, and from 1937 to 1939. Beggs was a Democrat. Beggs supported United States Senator Robert M. La Follette, Sr. and was involved with the Wisconsin Progressive Party. He moved to Madison, Wisconsin after his term ended in the Wisconsin Legislature. Beggs died suddenly of a heart attack the day after his seventy-ninth birthday at his home in Madison, Wisconsin. His son Lyall T. Beggs also served in the Wisconsin Assembly.

Notes

External links

1860 births
1939 deaths
People from Barron County, Wisconsin
Politicians from Madison, Wisconsin
People from Plainfield, Wisconsin
Businesspeople from Madison, Wisconsin
Wisconsin Progressives (1924)
20th-century American politicians
County supervisors in Wisconsin
Mayors of places in Wisconsin
People from Rice Lake, Wisconsin
Democratic Party members of the Wisconsin State Assembly